Alfred Joseph Boardman (11 May 1859 – 11 November 1928) was an English first-class cricketer.

Boardman was born at Barnsbury in Islington in May 1859. He made his debut in first-class cricket for Surrey against Nottinghamshire at Nottingham in 1878. He played first-class cricket for Surrey until 1880, making nine appearances, as well as appearing in one first-class match during that time for London United Eleven against the United North of England Eleven at Birmingham in 1879. In ten first-class matches, he scored 162 runs at an average of 9.52, with a high score of 33. He died at Carshalton in November 1928.

References

External links

1859 births
1928 deaths
People from the London Borough of Islington
English cricketers
Surrey cricketers
London United Eleven cricketers